Wesley Koolhof and Matwé Middelkoop were the defending champions but chose not to defend their title.

Lorenzo Sonego and Andrea Vavassori won the title after defeating Sander Arends and Sander Gillé 6–3, 3–6, [10–7] in the final.

Seeds

Draw

References
 Main Draw

Internazionali di Tennis Castel del Monte - Doubles
2017 Doubles